James Ross Walker (born July 1, 1971) is an American former Major League Baseball relief pitcher. He previously pitched for the Kansas City Royals, Detroit Tigers, and Baltimore Orioles.

Biography

Walker graduated from Warren County Senior High in McMinnville, Tennessee in 1989. He attended Austin Peay State University between 1990 and 1992 and ranks fifth all-time in school history with 17 wins and first with three career shutouts. Walker was drafted in the 10th round (265th overall) of the 1992 MLB draft by the Houston Astros.

Walker crossed the picket lines and participated in spring training during the 1994 Major League Baseball strike as a replacement player.  As a result, he was barred membership to the Major League Baseball Players Association.  This prevented Walker from being listed among Tigers players on their 2006 ALCS championship merchandise.  Walker has been clear and candid about his role as a replacement player with his major league teammates.

In , Walker nearly broke the major league record for most appearances in a season without a decision (no wins or losses). The record was held by Scott Aldred (a former Tiger, coincidentally), who made 48 appearances for the 1998 Tampa Bay Devil Rays while accomplishing this feat. By September 29 (with three games left in the season), he had pitched in 54 games without being credited with a win or a loss. However, he would surrender four runs on three home runs against his former team (the Kansas City Royals) in the top of the 11th inning and was charged with a loss. However, Aldred's record would only hold for one more season, as Trever Miller of the Houston Astros set the new mark by making 76 appearances without a decision in 2007.

Honors and awards
Walker was named Ohio Valley Conference Pitcher of the Year in 1992. He was inducted into the Austin Peay State University Athletics Hall of Fame on February 8, 2003, and into the Warren County, Tennessee Sports Hall of Fame on December 19, 2006.

Personal life
Walker is married (wife Natalie) and has three sons (Ross, born 1995, James Leyland, born 2007, and Isaac, born 2009). Although the name is the same, he is not named after Walker's former manager in Detroit. He also has two daughters (Harlee, born 1999; Hannah, born 2004). The family resides on their Kansas ranch in Smith Center. They have a second home in Overland Park, Kansas.

See also
LOOGY

Notes and references

External links

1971 births
Major League Baseball pitchers
Austin Peay Governors baseball players
Baseball players from Tennessee
Bowie Baysox players
Baltimore Orioles players
Buffalo Bisons (minor league) players
Detroit Tigers players
Frederick Keys players
Kansas City Royals players
Living people
Omaha Royals players
People from McMinnville, Tennessee
Toledo Mud Hens players
Wichita Wranglers players
People from Smith Center, Kansas
Auburn Astros players
Gulf Coast Royals players
Jackson Generals (Texas League) players
Omaha Golden Spikes players
Quad Cities River Bandits players